Filippo Marricchi (born 4 February 1999) is an Italian football player. He plays for Foligno.

Club career
He first joined Novara youth team on loan in the summer of 2017 and made several bench appearances for the senior squad in the 2017–18 Serie B season.

On 24 July 2018, he re-joined Novara (by this time relegated to Serie C) on a two-year loan with option to purchase. He made his Serie C debut for Novara on 14 October 2018 in a game against Carrarese as a 65th-minute substitute for Michele Di Gregorio.

In July 2019, his loan was converted to a permanent transfer.

On 23 January 2021, he joined Serie D club Foligno.

International
He played for the Italy national under-17 football team in 2016 UEFA European Under-17 Championship qualification. He was not selected for the final tournament in favour of Alessandro Plizzari and Gabriel Meli.

References

External links
 

1999 births
People from Orvieto
Sportspeople from the Province of Terni
Living people
Italian footballers
Italy youth international footballers
Association football goalkeepers
Novara F.C. players
A.S.D. Città di Foligno 1928 players
Serie C players
Serie D players
Footballers from Umbria